A Night at Birdland Vol. 2 is a 1954 release by jazz drummer Art Blakey, and a quintet which featured Clifford Brown, Lou Donaldson, Horace Silver and Curley Russell. It was first released by Blue Note Records as a 10" LP (BLP 5038). Two years later, the three 10" LPs in the set were reissued as 2 12" LPs; the 12" Vol. 2 is BLP 1521. Two of the three tracks ("Mayreh" and "A Night in Tunisia") of the original 10" Vol. 2 were included in the 12" Vol. 1. The 12" Vol. 2 incorporates all three tracks from the 10" A Night at Birdland Vol. 3 plus a previously unreleased alternate take of "Quicksilver."

A Night at Birdland Vol. 2 was reissued for the first time on CD in 1987 with two additional tracks ("The Way You Look Tonight" and "Lou's Blues"). "The Way You Look Tonight" had been previously released on a 2 LP Compilation in 1975 called Live Messengers (BN-LA473-J2). The CD was reissued again in 2001 as an "RVG Edition" remastered by Rudy Van Gelder with the tracks in a different order. The 1987 CD used the second 12" LP cover, the 2001 CD revived the original 10" LP cover.

All of the music surfaced as part of a Clifford Brown box set for Mosaic Records (MR5-104) and a complete Clifford Brown set put out by Capitol has also appeared.

The recording was produced by Alfred Lion and engineered by Rudy Van Gelder for Blue Note.

Track listing

10" LP

12" LP

CD Reissues

Personnel
Art Blakey Quintet:
Art Blakey — drums
Clifford Brown — trumpet
Lou Donaldson — alto saxophone
Horace Silver — piano
Curley Russell — bass

Production:
Bob Bluementhal, Leonard Feather — liner notes
Michael Cuscuna — reissue producer
John Hermansader, Reid Miles — cover design
Alfred Lion — producer
Ron McMaster — digital transfers
Rudy Van Gelder — engineer, mastering
Francis Wolff — photography

Reception

The two albums that were released from the Birdland are considered by The Penguin Guide to Jazz to be part of their "core collection". Allaboutjazz.com reviewer said it simply with "Blakey and company had clicked that night at Birdland." Allmusic mentions that, on this second album, "all of the musicians are inspired, none more than Blakey."

References

External links

Albums produced by Alfred Lion
Albums produced by Michael Cuscuna
Art Blakey live albums
1954 live albums
Blue Note Records live albums
Capitol Records live albums
United States National Recording Registry recordings